Gerd Hornberger (17 February 1910 – 13 September 1988) was a German athlete who competed mainly in the 100 metres.

He competed for Germany in the 1936 Summer Olympics held in Berlin, Germany in the 4 x 100 metre relay, winning the bronze medal with his team mates Wilhelm Leichum, Erich Borchmeyer and Erwin Gillmeister.

Hornberger was born and died in Waldfischbach-Burgalben.

Competition record

References

1910 births
1988 deaths
Athletes (track and field) at the 1936 Summer Olympics
German male sprinters
Olympic athletes of Germany
Olympic bronze medalists for Germany
People from the Palatinate (region)
European Athletics Championships medalists
Medalists at the 1936 Summer Olympics
Olympic bronze medalists in athletics (track and field)
Officers Crosses of the Order of Merit of the Federal Republic of Germany